Many air forces, some navies, and even a few private organizations have established air display teams to perform in domestic and international air shows. Some display teams perform aerobatics, while others give displays of formation flying or their operations such as air-sea rescue.

Air display teams

Active 

Formation flying

Inactive 

Aerobatics

Formation flying

References

Citations

Bibliography

External links
Demonstration Flight Teams
Military Flight Demonstration Teams of the World

Air display teams